Yoshihito Nishioka won his maiden ATP Challenger Tour title, beating 2nd seed Somdev Devvarman 6–4, 6–7(5–7), 7–6(7–3)

Seeds

Draw

Finals

Top half

Bottom half

External links
 Main Draw
 Qualifying Draw

Shanghai Challenger - Singles
2014 Singles